Fontenoy United F.C. is a Grenadian football club from the neighborhood of Fontenoy St. George's, Grenada that plays in the Grenada Premier Division.

Honours
 Grenada Premier Division:
 Champions (1): 1998

References

External links

Fontenoy